Andrei Vladimirovich Sklyarov (born 30 September 1989) is a Russian former professional footballer.

Club career
He made his debut in the Russian Premier League on 25 July 2009 in a game against FC Tom Tomsk.

External links

References

1989 births
Living people
Russian footballers
Association football defenders
Russian expatriate footballers
Expatriate footballers in Finland
Russian Premier League players
FC Rostov players
TP-47 players